"Like a Lion" is song written by Daniel Bashta and originally performed by Passion (with David Crowder) on the 2010 album Passion: Awakening. In 2011, it was covered by Newsboys as "God's Not Dead (Like a Lion)" and released as a single from the album God's Not Dead. The song appeared on charts during its release in 2012. The song charted in 2014, after the release of the film, God's Not Dead. The band performs the song, in a concert sequence, dedicating the song to the film's protagonist Josh Wheaton, at the end of the film. The song was released through Inpop Records. It is also heard in the credits of God's Not Dead 2 and God's Not Dead: A Light in Darkness.

Background 
The song was written by Daniel Bashta. The lead vocals are performed by David Crowder.

Newsboys version 

In the Newsboys version, the lead vocals are performed by Michael Tait and features fellow DC Talk member Kevin Max.

It was first released as a single on 12 October 2011, peaking at No. 2 on 9 June 2012 after spending 22 weeks on the Billboard Hot Christian Songs. and then again when the film of the same name was released in 2014. It helped to propel "We Believe", from Restart, to the No. 2 position on the chart as well.

In the United States, the single reached gold sales in June 2014, and by May 2015 it became the band's first platinum single, selling more than 1 million.

Music video 
The music video for the song was published on 6 January 2012. The video is set in New York City, and also shows many views of the Hudson River. During the video, the Newsboys themselves, along with others, read a headline stating: "God Is a Myth". In the video, the Newsboys are seen performing in both a concert, and a smaller studio setting.

Charts

Decade-end charts

Certifications

References 

2012 songs